Matthias Verschave (born 24 December 1977) is a French former professional footballer who played as a forward.

Career
Verschave was born in Lesquin. He began his playing career with Paris Saint-Germain, and played on loan for Football League Second Division side Swansea City and Clermont Foot. He later played for Ligue 2 sides Stade Reims and Stade Brestois 29.

References

1985 births
Living people
People from Lesquin
Sportspeople from Nord (French department)
French footballers
Footballers from Hauts-de-France
Association football forwards
English Football League players
Singapore Premier League players
Cypriot Second Division players
Swansea City A.F.C. players
Clermont Foot players
Stade de Reims players
Stade Brestois 29 players
Olympiakos Nicosia players
Étoile FC players
French expatriate footballers
French expatriate sportspeople in Wales
Expatriate footballers in Wales
French expatriate sportspeople in Cyprus
Expatriate footballers in Cyprus
French expatriate sportspeople in Singapore
Expatriate footballers in Singapore